The White Panther is a 1924 American drama film set in India starring Australian actor Snowy Baker in a story about the love affair between Major Wainwright, an English officer, and the governor's daughter. It features an early appearance by Boris Karloff. It is considered a lost film.

Plot
As described in a review of the film in a film magazine, Irene Falliday (McConnell) is the daughter of the British governor of an Indian province. She loses a shawl and finds Yasmini (Scott) wearing it. Irene asks Tommy Farrell (Burke), an English officer who is in love with her, to get the shawl back. Yasmiri falls in love with Tommy Farrell. The circumstances of obtaining the shawl shame her in the eyes of her father, Shere Ali (Whitson), the Sirdar of the Afghans, and his subjects. They seize Irene, but she is saved by "The White Panther," a mysterious raider of the desert on a white horse, who in reality is Major Bruce Wainwright (Baker). He has been the champion of all victims of the desert bandits, and fights for Irene at the risk of his life. Tommy is killed in a feud and the British cavalry arrive in time to save Bruce and Irene.

Cast
Snowy Baker as Major Bruce Wainwright
Gertrude McConnell as Irene Falliday
Lois Scott as Yasmini
Frank Whitson as Shere Ali
Phil Burke as Tommy Farrell
William Bainbridge as British governor
Billy Franey as The Private
Boris Karloff as "a native"
Stanely Bigham as The Bandit Leader

References

External links

1924 films
1924 drama films
Silent American drama films
American black-and-white films
American silent feature films
Films directed by Alan James
1920s American films